Omorgus elderi is a species of hide beetle in the subfamily Omorginae.

References

elderi
Beetles described in 1892